Agricultural Mortgage Corporation may refer to:

Agricultural Mortgage Corporation, a subsidiary of Lloyds Banking Group in the United Kingdom
Federal Agricultural Mortgage Corporation, commonly known as Farmer Mac in the United States

See also
ACC Loan Management, formerly the Agricultural Credit Corporation in the Republic of Ireland